Jason MacDonald Wheeler (born October 27, 1990) is an American former  professional baseball pitcher.  He played in Major League Baseball (MLB) for the Minnesota Twins.

Amateur career
Wheeler attended Loyola Marymount University, and in 2011 he played collegiate summer baseball with the Orleans Firebirds of the Cape Cod Baseball League.

Professional career

Minnesota Twins
Wheeler was drafted by the Minnesota Twins in the eighth round of the 2011 Major League Baseball Draft. Wheeler was called up to the majors for the first time on May 29, 2017, and made his major league debut the next day.

Los Angeles Dodgers
Wheeler was traded to the Los Angeles Dodgers on June 2nd, 2017 for Cash Considerations. He was designated for assignment on June 18.

Baltimore Orioles
He was traded to the Baltimore Orioles on July 2. He elected free agency on October 2, 2017.

Hanwha Eagles
On November 15, 2017, Wheeler signed with the Hanwha Eagles of the KBO League. He was released on July 13, 2018.

Personal life
His brother, Ryan Wheeler, also played in Major League Baseball.

References

External links

1990 births
Living people
Baseball players from Torrance, California
Beloit Snappers players
Chattanooga Lookouts players
Fort Myers Miracle players
Loyola Marymount Lions baseball players
Major League Baseball pitchers
Minnesota Twins players
New Britain Rock Cats players
Norfolk Tides players
Oklahoma City Dodgers players
Orleans Firebirds players
Rochester Red Wings players
Tulsa Drillers players
St. Cloud River Bats players